Vincent Rey (born September 6, 1987) is a former American football linebacker. He was signed by the Cincinnati Bengals as an undrafted free agent in 2010. He played college football at Duke. He attended Mercersburg Academy and graduated in 2006.

Professional career

Cincinnati Bengals
On April 26, 2010, the Cincinnati Bengals signed Rey to a two-year, $731,000 contract after he went undrafted in the 2010 NFL Draft.

He was waived on September 4, 2010, and re-signed to the practice squad the next day. On December 8, 2010, Rey was promoted to the Bengals active roster and played in his first two career games in Weeks 15 and 16.

His first career start came on October 31, 2013 against the Miami Dolphins on Thursday Night Football. Due to an injury to starter Rey Maualuga, Rey was called upon to start in multiple games in 2013, and then again in 2014 with injuries to starter Vontaze Burfict. He showed an ability to line up at any linebacker position and had a strong command of the defense, often calling plays and setting formations when in the game.

Rey signed a new two-year deal with the Bengals on March 14, 2014. On March 9, 2016, Rey signed a three-year, $11.5 million extension with the Bengals.

Post-playing career
After his retirement in 2018, Rey took a job with the Cincinnati Bengals as the team chaplain starting in the 2021 season.

References

External links
Cincinnati Bengals bio

1987 births
Living people
Sportspeople from Queens, New York
Players of American football from New York City
People from Far Rockaway, Queens
American football linebackers
Duke Blue Devils football players
Cincinnati Bengals players